The Irish component of the December 1910 United Kingdom general election took place between 3 and 19 December, concurrently with the polls in Great Britain. Though the national result was a deadlock between the Conservatives and the Liberals, the result in Ireland was, as was the trend by now, a large victory for the Irish Parliamentary Party. The IPP supported the Liberals to form a government after the election. This was to be the party's last victory, however. Due to the outbreak of World War I in 1914, the next general election would not be held until 1918, by which time events both in Ireland and Britain and outside would conspire to see the rise of a new nationalist party, Sinn Féin, and the subsequent demise of the IPP.

It was the government formed by this election which brought in the final Home Rule Bill in 1912, enacted as the Government of Ireland Act 1914. The outbreak of the war led to its delay and eventual abandonment in response to the rise of Sinn Féin.

Summary

The Irish Parliamentary Party under John Redmond continued the run of success it had enjoyed since the 1880s, winning most seats in Leinster, Munster and Connacht. In Ulster, the Conservative and Liberal Unionist alliance continued to dominate, while the Liberals retained their single seat in North Tyrone. The other party to win seats was the All-for-Ireland League, which lost two seats in Counties Louth and Mayo but gained two in County Cork, effectively isolating it to that county; meanwhile Independent Nationalists won seats in South Monaghan and North Westmeath.

Though they had been electorally allied for decades, the Liberal Unionists officially merged with the Conservatives in 1912 to form the Conservative and Unionist Party.

The war caused an unprecedented eight-year gap between this election and the next one. As a result, a large number of by-elections were held over the parliament's term. 1917 saw the first electoral victory for a new nationalist party, Sinn Féin, which won its first seat in the Roscommon North by-election of February 1917. The party would gain more seats in further by-elections, precipitating its landslide victory over the I.P.P. in the 1918 general election. Among the Sinn Féin MPs elected during this time were future Taoiseach and President of Ireland Éamon de Valera and future President of the Executive Council W. T. Cosgrave. Sinn Féin's cause was not Home rule but rather complete independence for an Irish Republic. The party and its members had been heavily involved in the Easter Rising of 1916, in which an unofficial republic had been declared. Its elected MPs operated by a policy of abstentionism from Westminster. Sinn Féin would use its success in the next election to form its own extra-legal parliament, Dáil Éireann in Dublin.

The Dublin College Green by-election of June 1915 saw the first electoral outing of the Irish Labour Party, founded two years previous by James Connolly and James Larkin. The party lost out to the IPP, and did not contest another election until the 1922 Irish general election.

Results

Membership changes

See also
History of Ireland (1801–1923)
List of MPs elected in the December 1910 United Kingdom general election (Ireland)
Parliamentary franchise in the United Kingdom 1885–1918

Ireland
General elections in Ireland to the Parliament of the United Kingdom
Home rule in Ireland
1910s in Irish politics
December 1910 events
1910 elections in Ireland